Praia das Adegas is a beach situated in Odeceixe, municipality of Aljezur, in the Atlantic west coast of Algarve, southern Portugal. It is one of the six official naturist beaches in the country.

External links

Beaches of Aljezur